BloodHorse is a multimedia news organization covering Thoroughbred racing and breeding that started with a newsletter first published in 1916 as a monthly bulletin put out by the Thoroughbred Horse Association.
In 1935 the business was purchased by the American Thoroughbred Breeders Association. From 1961 to 2015, it was owned by the Thoroughbred Owners and Breeders Association, a non-profit organization that promotes Thoroughbred racing, breeding, and ownership. The company operated as Blood-Horse Publications beginning in 2000. In 2015, The Jockey Club purchased a majority share in the publication. The magazine changed to a monthly distribution in April 2021.

Based in Lexington, Kentucky, the publication's media kit states that the magazine "coverage includes race reporting, comprehensive analysis, events, trends, debate, farm management, pedigrees, people, profiles, medication issues, investigative reports, and breeding news and information, and anything newsworthy and important to the racing and breeding industry." ESPN has called The Blood-Horse the thoroughbred industry's most-respected trade publication.

The magazine won acclaim for its exclusive report indicating that 1986 Kentucky Derby winner Ferdinand had been slaughtered by his owners overseas after a marginal stud career. The news resulted in increased efforts to save retired racehorses.

The Blood-Horse has an online version, at bloodhorse.com. In August 2015 Blood-Horse Daily was launched, the content is available on an app, by email subscription or downloadable from the website

For the new millennium, the magazine compiled a List of the Top 100 U.S. Racehorses of the 20th Century which was published in book form.

The similarly titled Australian Bloodhorse Review is unaffiliated.

History
In 1916, the first Kentucky Thoroughbred Horse Association Bulletin was posted – Volume 1, Number 1 was published August 1, 1916 by the Kentucky Thoroughbred Horse Association to serve a small community of breeders. The Bulletin was renamed The Blood-Horse and taken to a weekly frequency in 1929 and expanded to serve a global audience. The first issue of the public The Blood-Horse was published May 11, 1929 and held Blue Larkspur as the cover image.

The last of the original members that published The Blood-Horse was Thomas Piatt; A charter member in 1916, former VP of the old Thoroughbred Horse Association, and director of American Thoroughbred Breeders Association. He was also the founding member of the Thoroughbred Owners and Breeders Association.

Thomas Cromwell was the first editor of magazine. Joe Estes joined The Blood-Horse in 1930 and later became the second editor-in-chief. He was succeeded by Kent Hollingsworth, Ed Bowen, Ray Paulick and Dan Liebman.

Blood-Horse books
 Horse Racing's Top 100 Moments by The Blood-Horse Staff. Blood-Horse Publications (2006) 
 Thoroughbred Champions: Top 100 Racehorses of the 20th Century by The Blood-Horse Staff. Eclipse Press (1999) 
 Handicapping the Wall Street Way by Mark Ripple. (2005)

See also
 Blood-Horse magazine List of Top 100 Racehorses of the 20th Century
Average Earnings Index (horse racing)

References

External links
 Thoroughbred Owners and Breeders Association Website

1916 establishments in Kentucky
Equine magazines published in Kentucky
Equestrian sports in the United States
Horse racing
Magazines established in 1916
Magazines published in Kentucky
Weekly magazines published in the United States